The 1888 Harvard Prep School football team of Chicago represented Harvard School of Chicago during the 1888 college football season.  In (at least) their 3rd year fielding a football team (as the school played Michigan in 1887, losing 0-26, and Northwestern in 1886, winning 32-4), the Harvard's as they were called, compiled a 6–1 record (according to one unverified source).  They also had a Junior (JV) team, who reportedly won the Junior Championship of Illinois, although this was just a claim, and not an official title or award.  The team played at the Wanderer's Athletic Club cricket grounds, on 37th Street and Indiana Avenue.  They would play two collegiate teams during the football season, defeating Lake Forest 22 to 4 (or 22–6), and losing to Notre Dame 20 to 0, which would become the University's first victory in a football game.

Schedules

Varsity team

Junior team

Practice games

Notes: The Thanksgiving Day game with Hyde Park and the October 27th contest against the Chicago Normal School may not have occurred.  It is likely that the games against Chicago Normal school, Evanston Athletic Club, and Harvard-Yale Graduates, were wins for the Harvards, given the record discovered by historian Robert Pruter, but his research on the team already had one known inaccuracy, announcing Harvard Prep School as "Cook County League Champions", although the Cook County League would not be formed until 1889, and would not include Harvard Prep.  Both Harvard Prep's 1st and Junior teams claimed the Illinois or junior championship at certain points in the season, but these claims are not substantial, or backed up by any sources.  An article in the South Bend Tribune on December 6, 1888, corroborates that Harvard Prep had not lost a contest prior to playing Notre Dame.

Roster

1st Team
Donnelly- Center
Allen- Rusher
R. McDermid- Rusher
Wright- Rusher
Hoyle- Rusher
Fair- Rusher
Marriner- Rusher
Peoples- Rusher
Bert Hamlin- Quarterback (Captain)
George Hamlin- Halfback
Valentine- Halfback
Page- Halfback
Ritchie- Halfback
Herrick- Fullback
Neely- Fullback
Sargent- Fullback
Crawford

Junior Team
Thorne- Center
Young- Rusher
R. Jocklyn- Rusher
Wilson- Rusher
Krouse- Rusher
McGilvery- Rusher
McClever- Rusher
R. Hamlin- Quarterback
Fargo- Halfback
Levy- Halfback
R. McDermid- Fullback
Harry Hamlin

References

Chicago Harvard Prep School
Chicago Harvard Prep School football team
1880s in Chicago
American football in Chicago
College sports in Chicago